Larry Joseph Siever was an American psychiatrist who was a leading figure in the study of personality disorders.

Career
He worked at the Mount Sinai Hospital and James J. Peters VA Medical Center. Siever was the director Mood and Personality Disorders Program at Mount Sinai and the director of the Mental Illness Research, Education and Clinical Centers at the James J Peters VA Medical Center. He was president of the Society of Biological Psychiatry and a fellow of the American College of Neuropsychopharmacology. Siever also founded the Veterans Integrated Service Networks. He died in 2021 due to illness.

He graduated from Harvard College and Stanford University School of Medicine.

Research
Larry's research led to the removal of the distinction between Axis I and Axis II personality disorders. Siever primarily studied the neuroscientific causes of Schizotypal (StPD) and Borderline personality disorder (BPD). To do this, he researched dopamine's relationship with StPD and used Positron Emission Tomography to understand the chemical causes of BPD. Alongside personality disorders, he was also knowledgeable in the fields of personality, schizophrenia, mood, impulse-control disorders. Siever published more than 400 peer reviewed papers on personality disorders.

Honors
Because of his efforts, in 2011 he was awarded the title of "Presidential Scholar" in recognition of his "distinguished and pioneering contributions to the study of personality disorders” by the International Society for the Study of Personality Disorders. Siever's research also lead to the American Psychiatric Association awarding him the Judd Marmor award in 2011.

References 

1947 births
2021 deaths
20th-century American physicians
21st-century American physicians
American psychiatrists
Harvard College alumni
Stanford University School of Medicine alumni